Antonio Battista (born 10 February 1957 in Campobasso) is an Italian politician.

He is a member of the Democratic Party.

Battista served as Mayor of Campobasso from May 2014 to June 2019. He was also elected President of the Province of Campobasso on 1 September 2016.

See also
2014 Italian local elections
List of mayors of Campobasso

References

External links
 
 

1957 births
Living people
Mayors of Campobasso
Democratic Party (Italy) politicians
Presidents of the Province of Campobasso